The Classic Della is an album by actress and singer Della Reese. The songs are based on classical music pieces by Tchaikovsky ("Symphony No. 6," "Melodie Op. 42"), Debussy ("Reverie"), Schubert ("Serenade"), Chopin ("Etude in E, Op. 10 No. 3," "Polonaise No. 6 Op. 53"), and Puccini ("Musetta's Waltz Song" from La Bohème). The album was arranged and conducted by Glenn Osser and produced by Hugo and Luigi who wrote in the liner notes,  "It was after the album was finished and we were listening to the first playbacks that we decided on the title ... the only title that can describe the content and the artistry captured in these grooves ... THE CLASSIC DELLA." Hugo and Luigi

Track listing

 "The Story of a Starry Night" (Pyotr Il'yich Tchaikovsky adpt. Mann Curtis, Al Hoffman, Jerry Livingston)  2:50
 "These Are the Things I Love" (Tchaikovsky adpt. Barlow, Harris) 3:35
 "If You Are But a Dream" (Rubenstein adapt. Nat Bonx, Jack Fulton, Moe Jaffe) 3:07
 "My Reverie" (Claude Debussy adapt. Clinton) 3:39
 "Take My Heart" (Albert Ketèlbey adapt. Luigi Creatore,  Peretti, Wess) 2:44
 "Stranger in Paradise" (Alexander Borodin adapt. Forrest, Wright) 3:01
 "Gone" (Riccardo Drigo adapt. Peretti, Creatore, Weiss) 2:38
 "Serenade" (Franz Schubert adapt. Peretti, Creatore, Weiss) 3:24
 "Moon Love" (Tchaikovsky adapt. David, Davis, Kostelanetz) 2:58
 "Softly My Love"  (Chopin adapt. Bennett, Tepper) 2:42
 "Till the End of Time"  (Chopin adapt. Kaye, Mossman) 3:30
 "Don't You Know?"  (Puccini adapt. Bobby Worth) 2:35

Charts
Album

Single

References

1962 albums
Della Reese albums
RCA Victor albums
Albums produced by Hugo & Luigi